Logan Storley (born September 8, 1992) is an American professional mixed martial artist and folkstyle wrestler. He currently competes in the welterweight division of Bellator MMA, where he is a former interim Bellator Welterweight World Champion. As a folkstyle wrestler, he was a four-time NCAA Division I All-American for the Minnesota Golden Gophers and a six-time SDHSAA state champion as a high schooler. As of May 17, 2022, he is #10 in the Bellator men's pound-for-pound rankings.

Background
Storley grew up in Roslyn, South Dakota and started wrestling when he was 5 years old. He has a degree in business and marketing.

Wrestling career

High school 
Storley was an accomplished high school wrestler. He was a six-time SDHSAA title holder and graduated from Webster High School with a record of 262 wins and 3 losses throughout his 6 years of eligibility (competing in high school varsity). In 2010, he won the NHSCA National Championship as a junior. He also competed in freestyle, winning the 2009 Fargo Nationals.

College 
At college, he also amassed multiple achievements while competing for the Golden Gophers. He became a four-time All-American, placing sixth as a true freshman, fourth as a sophomore, third as a junior, and once again fourth as a senior at the NCAA Division I Championships. At the Big Ten Conference championships, he became the runner-up of the tournament as a freshman (falling to Ed Ruth), placed seventh as a sophomore and fourth as a junior and senior. He graduated in 2015 with a 119–27 record.

Mixed martial arts career

Early career 
Storley amassed an unbeaten record of 5 wins, with all of his wins coming by first-round knockout prior to signing with Bellator.

Bellator MMA 
In his promotional debut, Storley faced Kemmyelle Haley on July 14, 2017, at Bellator 181. He won the fight by technical knockout in the second round.

Storley faced Marc Secor on November 3, 2017, at Bellator 186. He won the fight by unanimous decision in the first non-stoppage win of his career.

Storley faced Joaquin Buckley on April 13, 2018, at Bellator 197. He won the fight by unanimous decision.

Storley faced A.J. Matthews on August 17, 2018, at Bellator 204. He won the fight by second-round technical knockout.

Storley faced Ion Pascu on February 15, 2019, at Bellator 215. He won the fight by unanimous decision.

Storley faced E. J. Brooks on November 8, 2019, at Bellator 233. He won the fight by technical knockout after Brooks was unable to continue due to an arm injury.

Storley was scheduled to face Mark Lemminger on July 24, 2020, at Bellator 242. However, he was forced to pull out of the bout due to an injury on July 16.

Storley faced fellow undefeated mixed martial artist Yaroslav Amosov at Bellator 252 on November 12, 2020. He lost the back-and-forth bout by split decision, marking the first defeat of his career.

Storley was expected to face Killys Mota at Bellator 258 on May 7, 2021. However, Mota withdrew from the bout due to lingering issues after contracting COVID-19. Mota was replaced by Omar Hussein. Hours before the event, the bout was canceled after Hussein was not medically cleared to compete.

Storley faced Dante Schiro on August 20, 2021, at Bellator 265. He won the fight via split decision.

Storley faced Neiman Gracie on February 19, 2022, at Bellator 274. He won the mostly standup bout via unanimous decision.

Storley, replacing Yaroslav Amosov, faced Michael "Venom" Page on May 13, 2022, at Bellator 281 with the bout being for the interim Welterweight title. He won the fight via split decision.

Storley next had a rematch against reigning champion Yaroslav Amosov to unify the title on February 25, 2023, at Bellator 291. He lost the fight by unanimous decision.

Championships and accomplishments

Folkstyle wrestling
National Collegiate Athletic Association
NCAA Division I All-American out of University of Minnesota (2012, 2013, 2014, 2015)
NCAA Division I 174 lb – 6th place out of University of Minnesota (2012)
NCAA Division I 174 lb – 4th place out of University of Minnesota (2013, 2015)
NCAA Division I 174 lb – 3rd place out of University of Minnesota (2014)
Big Ten Conference
Big Ten Conference 174 lb - 2nd place out of University of Minnesota  (2012)
Big Ten Conference 174 lb - 7th place out of University of Minnesota  (2013)
Big Ten Conference 174 lb - 4th place out of University of Minnesota  (2014, 2015)
South Dakota High School Activities Association
SDHSAA State Championship out of Webster High School (2006, 2007, 2008, 2009, 2010, 2011)

Mixed martial arts
Bellator MMA
Interim Bellator Welterweight World Championship (One time)

Mixed martial arts record
 

|-
| Loss
|align=center|14–2
|Yaroslav Amosov 
|Decision (Unanimous)
|Bellator 291
|
|align=center|5
|align=center|5:00
|Dublin, Ireland
|
|-
|Win
|align=center|14–1
|Michael Page
|Decision (split)
|Bellator 281
|
| align=center|5
| align=center|5:00
|London, England
|
|-
|Win
|align=center|13–1
|Neiman Gracie
|Decision (unanimous)
|Bellator 274
|
| align=center| 5
| align=center| 5:00
|Uncasville, Connecticut, United States
|
|-
|Win
|align=center|12–1
| Dante Schiro
| Decision (split)
| Bellator 265
| 
| align=center| 3
| align=center| 5:00
| Sioux Falls, South Dakota, United States
| 
|-
|Loss
|align=center|11–1
|Yaroslav Amosov 
|Decision (split)
|Bellator 252 
|
|align=center|3
|align=center|5:00
|Uncasville, Connecticut, United States 
|
|-
|Win
|align=center|11–0
|E. J. Brooks
|TKO (arm injury)
|Bellator 233
|
|align=center|1
|align=center|5:00
|Thackerville, Oklahoma, United States
|  
|-
|Win
|align=center|10–0
|Ion Pascu
|Decision (unanimous)
|Bellator 215
|
|align=center|3
|align=center|5:00
|Uncasville, Connecticut, United States
|
|-
|Win
|align=center|9–0
|A.J. Matthews
|TKO (elbows and punches)
|Bellator 204
|
|align=center|2
|align=center|3:56
|Sioux Falls, South Dakota, United States
|   
|-
|Win
|align=center|8–0
|Joaquin Buckley
|Decision (unanimous)
|Bellator 197
|
|align=center|3
|align=center|5:00
|St. Charles, Missouri, United States
|
|-
|Win
|align=center|7–0
|Matt Secor
|Decision (unanimous)
|Bellator 186
|
|align=center|3
|align=center|5:00
|University Park, Pennsylvania, United States
|
|-
|Win
|align=center|6–0
|Kemmyelle Haley
|TKO (elbows)
|Bellator 181
|
|align=center|1
|align=center|1:44
|Thackerville, Oklahoma, United States
|
|-
|Win
|align=center|5–0
|Andres Murray
|TKO (punches)
|LFA Fight Night: Sioux Falls
|
|align=center|1
|align=center|1:13
|Sioux Falls, South Dakota, United States
|
|-
|Win
|align=center|4–0
|Cody Lincoln
|TKO (punches)
|RFA 37
|
|align=center|1
|align=center|0:13
|Sioux Falls, South Dakota, United States
|
|-
|Win
|align=center|3–0
|Lemetra Griffin
|TKO (punches)
|RFA 36
|
|align=center|1
|align=center|0:33
|Prior Lake, Minnesota, United States
|
|-
|Win
|align=center|2–0
|Marc Hummel
|TKO (punches)
|RFA 32
|
|align=center|1
|align=center|3:17
|Prior Lake, Minnesota, United States
|
|-
|Win
|align=center|1–0
|Bill Mees
|TKO (punches)
|RFA 29
|
|align=center|1
|align=center|2:32
|Sioux Falls, South Dakota, United States
|

NCAA record

! colspan="8"| NCAA Championships Matches
|-
!  Res.
!  Record
!  Opponent
!  Score
!  Date
!  Event
|-
! style=background:white colspan=6 |2015 NCAA Championships 4th at 174 lbs
|-
|Loss
|16-7
|align=left|Robert Kokesh
|style="font-size:88%"|SV 4-6
|style="font-size:88%" rowspan=6|March 21, 2015
|style="font-size:88%" rowspan=6|2015 NCAA Division I Wrestling Championships
|-
|Win
|16-6
|align=left|Kyle Crutchmer
|style="font-size:88%"|TB 9-7
|-
|Win
|15-6
|align=left|Cody Walters
|style="font-size:88%"|3-0
|-
|Loss
|14-6
|align=left|Mike Evans
|style="font-size:88%"|TB 1-2
|-
|Win
|14-5
|align=left|Zach Brunson
|style="font-size:88%"|4-0
|-
|Win
|13-5
|align=left|Brian Harvey
|style="font-size:88%"|11-9
|-
! style=background:white colspan=6 |2014 NCAA Championships  at 174 lbs
|-
|Win
|12-5
|align=left|Robert Kokesh
|style="font-size:88%"|TB 3-1
|style="font-size:88%" rowspan=6|March 22, 2014
|style="font-size:88%" rowspan=6|2014 NCAA Division I Wrestling Championships
|-
|Win
|11-5
|align=left|Matt Brown
|style="font-size:88%"|SV 3-1
|-
|Loss
|10-5
|align=left|Andrew Howe
|style="font-size:88%"|3-6
|-
|Win
|10-4
|align=left|Robert Kokesh
|style="font-size:88%"|TB 6-4
|-
|Win
|9-4
|align=left|Stephen Doty
|style="font-size:88%"|5-4
|-
|Win
|8-4
|align=left|Caleb Marsh
|style="font-size:88%"|5-2
|-
! style=background:white colspan=6 |2013 NCAA Championships 4th at 174 lbs
|-
|Loss
|7-4
|align=left|Robert Kokesh
|style="font-size:88%"|SV 1-3
|style="font-size:88%" rowspan=6|March 23, 2013
|style="font-size:88%" rowspan=6|2013 NCAA Division I Wrestling Championships
|-
|Win
|7-3
|align=left|Nick Heflin
|style="font-size:88%"|3-2
|-
|Loss
|6-3
|align=left|Matt Brown
|style="font-size:88%"|2-3
|-
|Win
|6-2
|align=left|Michael Evans
|style="font-size:88%"|3-2
|-
|Win
|5-2
|align=left|Matt Mougin
|style="font-size:88%"|MD 9-1
|-
|Win
|4-2
|align=left|Bryce Hammond
|style="font-size:88%"|3-1
|-
! style=background:white colspan=6 |2012 NCAA Championships 6th at 174 lbs
|-
|Loss
|3-2
|align=left|Jordan Blanton
|style="font-size:88%"|0-1
|style="font-size:88%" rowspan=5|March 17, 2012
|style="font-size:88%" rowspan=5|2012 NCAA Division I Wrestling Championships
|-
|Loss
|3-1
|align=left|Ed Ruth
|style="font-size:88%"|TF 1-17
|-
|Win
|3-0
|align=left|Luke Lofthouse
|style="font-size:88%"|4-2
|-
|Win
|2-0
|align=left|Lance Bryson
|style="font-size:88%"|2-0
|-
|Win
|1-0
|align=left|Levi Clemons
|style="font-size:88%"|MD 11-2
|-

See also
 List of current Bellator fighters

References

External links
 

1995 births
Living people
People from Windber, Pennsylvania
Mixed martial artists from Pennsylvania
University of Minnesota alumni
American male mixed martial artists
Mixed martial artists utilizing collegiate wrestling
American male sport wrestlers
Minnesota Golden Gophers wrestlers